Once a Sinner is a 1950 British drama film directed by Lewis Gilbert and starring Pat Kirkwood, Jack Watling and Joy Shelton.

Plot
Bank clerk John Ross (Jack Watling) falls for good-time girl Irene (Pat Kirkwood), and, although at first she tries to discourage him, they are quickly married. They soon find that Irene does not get along with John's middle-class parents and friends, and when he finally insists on meeting Irene's mother he is taken aback by her hostility towards her own daughter, but he learns that Irene has a child by her former lover, Jimmy (Sidney Tafler). When John tells her it's over between them, Irene reluctantly goes back to Jimmy and they move to London. A few weeks later, when John's father gives him his letters from Irene which his mother had tried to hide from him, John realises he still wants Irene and he sets off to find her. When he arrives, he eventually persuades Irene to go with him and they decide they will try to make a life together in a new place, away from his disapproving family and friends. However, on the train, they have a fateful encounter.

Cast
 Pat Kirkwood as Irene James  
 Jack Watling as John Ross  
 Joy Shelton as Vera Lamb  
 Sydney Tafler as Jimmy Smart  
 Thora Hird as Mrs. James  
 Humphrey Lestocq as Lewis Canfield 
 Gordon McLeod as Mr. Ross  
 Edith Sharpe as Mrs. Ross  
 Harry Fowler as Bill James  
 Danny Green as Ticker James  
 Stuart Lindsell as Inspector Rance  
 Olive Sloane as Lil
 George Street as Bridges 
 Rose Howlett as Mrs. Lamb 
 Charles Paton as Mr. Lamb 
 Stuart Latham as Charlie 
 Cameron Hall as Mr. Barker
 Nora Gordon as Mrs. Barker
 Norman Williams as Fred, Barman

Critical reception
Allmovie wrote, "The magnificent Thora Hird steals the show in Once a Sinner as the fickle Irene's slatternly mother."

References

External links

 
 
Review of film at Variety

1950 films
Films directed by Lewis Gilbert
1950 drama films
British drama films
Films set in London
British black-and-white films
Films shot at Station Road Studios, Elstree
1950s English-language films
1950s British films